Thurstan Tyldesley (by 1495 – 1554), of Tyldesley and Wardley Hall, near Worsley, Lancashire, was an English politician.

He was a Member (MP) of the Parliament of England for Lancashire in 1547.

References

15th-century births
1554 deaths
English MPs 1547–1552
People from Tyldesley
Members of the Parliament of England (pre-1707) for Lancashire